Kamionka Wielka  is a village in Nowy Sącz County, Lesser Poland Voivodeship, in southern Poland. It is the seat of the gmina (administrative district) called Gmina Kamionka Wielka.

The village has a population of 2,925.

References

Kamionka Wielka